Samantha Jane Atkeson Morgan ( – ), was an American painter who lived in Putnam County, West Virginia.

Biography 
She was one of nine children of Kanawha Valley settlers Thomas Atkeson and Virginia Harris Brown. Her siblings included US Congressman William Oscar Atkeson and agriculturalist and college president Thomas Clark Atkeson.

After the American Civil War, Atkeson studied at the Cincinnati Academy of Art (now Art Academy of Cincinnati) in Cincinnati, Ohio, then returned to Putnam County for the rest of her life. In 1875, she married John Morgan. They lived in Poca, West Virginia and had four children: John Morgan (1876–1947), Thomas Jefferson Morgan, a photographer (1878–1946), Rembrandt Morgan (1880–1964), and Albert Sidney Morgan (1883–1973).  

Throughout her life, Morgan painted portraits, landscapes, and depictions of wildlife.  Her work is included in the collections of the West Virginia State Museum. Her son Albert Sidney became an obsessive taxidermist and assembled a large collection of specimens that he exhibited as Morgan's Museum of Natural History, now part of the West Virginia State Farm Museum.  She created a number of paintings of his specimens and painted backgrounds for the mounted specimens. 

Samantha Jane Atkeson Morgan died of a stroke on March 31, 1926.

References 

Created via preloaddraft
1843 births
1926 deaths
People from Putnam County, West Virginia
American women painters
Art Academy of Cincinnati alumni
19th-century American women artists
20th-century American women artists